"Change Your Mind" is a song recorded by Australian country artist Keith Urban. The track was written by Fransisca Hall and Matthew Koma. It was the fifth single released in Australia off Urban's eleventh studio album The Speed of Now Part 1, and was released simultaneously with the official announcement of the album.

Critical reception
Angela Stefano of Taste of Country described the song as a "dreamy, though sad, look back at a past relationship". Hannah Barnes of Popculture called the song ""What-if"-driven". Soundigest stated that "Change Your Mind" is a "little bit different" than the singles "Polaroid" and "Superman" from The Speed of Now Part 1, and that shows how Urban "incorporates a layer of depth to every one of his projects".

Credits
Adapted from The Speed of Now Part 1 liner notes.

Matthew Koma – acoustic guitar, electric guitar, banjo, keyboards, drums, background vocals, production
Dan McCaroll – production
Wendy Molvion – bass guitar
Keith Urban – electric guitar solo, lead vocals, production

Chart performance
"Change Your Mind" reached a peak of number 30 on the TMN Country Hot 50 in Australia.

Release history

References

2020 songs
2020 singles
Keith Urban songs
Songs written by Fransisca Hall
Songs written by Matthew Koma